The 1954 Major League Baseball season was contested from April 13 to October 2, 1954. For the second consecutive season, an MLB franchise relocated, as the St. Louis Browns moved to Baltimore and became the Baltimore Orioles, who played their home games at Memorial Stadium.

Standings

American League

National League

Postseason

Bracket

Awards and honors
MLB Most Valuable Player Award
 Yogi Berra, New York Yankees, C
 Willie Mays, New York Giants, OF
MLB Rookie of the Year Award
 Bob Grim, New York Yankees, P
 Wally Moon, St. Louis Cardinals, OF
The Sporting News Player of the Year Award
Willie Mays New York Giants
The Sporting News Pitcher of the Year Award
Bob Lemon Cleveland Indians
Johnny Antonelli New York Giants
The Sporting News Manager of the Year Award
Leo Durocher New York Giants

Statistical leaders

All-Star game

Records
Umpire Bill McGowan set a Major League record by officiating in his 2,541st consecutive game.

Managers

American League

National League

Home Field Attendance

See also
1954 All-American Girls Professional Baseball League season
1954 Nippon Professional Baseball season

Notes

External links
1954 Major League Baseball season schedule at Baseball Reference

 
Major League Baseball seasons